Grand Duke Nicholas Nikolaevich of Russia may refer to:

 Grand Duke Nicholas Nikolaevich of Russia (1831-1891), third son and sixth child of Tsar Nicholas I of Russia and Charlotte of Prussia
 Grand Duke Nicholas Nikolaevich of Russia (1856-1929), his son